Kraków Governorate was an administrative unit (a governorate) of Congress Poland.

It was created in 1837 from the Kraków Voivodeship; in 1844 it was merged into a larger Radom Governorate.

References
Geographical Dictionary of the Kingdom of Poland

Governorates of Congress Poland
States and territories established in 1837
History of Lesser Poland
Establishments in Congress Poland